Barachois Harbour is a community in the Canadian province of Nova Scotia, located in the Cape Breton Regional Municipality on Cape Breton Island.

Point of interest
This community is home to Barachois Provincial Park. This picnic park was once a farm, but it is situated on a knoll under a canopy of trees providing a secluded and shaded picnicking experience. Nearby fishing opportunities are available on the Bras d'Or Lakes. A short trail leads from the park down to a marshy lagoon.

References

 Barachois Harbour on Destination Nova Scotia

Communities in the Cape Breton Regional Municipality